WKVW (93.3 FM) is a Contemporary Christian formatted broadcast radio station licensed to Marmet, West Virginia, serving Charleston and Kanawha County, West Virginia. WKVW is owned and operated by Educational Media Foundation.

WKVW is part of the K-Love network of Contemporary Christian Music radio stations.

External links
 K-LOVE Online
 

KVW
K-Love radio stations
Radio stations established in 1995
1995 establishments in West Virginia
Educational Media Foundation radio stations